Et cetera is a Latin expression that means "and other things" or "and so on".

Etcetera may also refer to:

Film, TV and theatre
 Etcetera (cat), a fictional character in Andrew Lloyd Webber's Cats
 Etcetera Theatre, a fringe venue for theatre and comedy
 Etcetera (TV program), a Philippine television program

Music
 Etcetera Records Dutch record label
 Etcetera, for orchestra & environmental tape (indeterminate) John Cage 1973

Bands
 Etc (Czech band), a Czech rock band
 Et Cetera (Montreal band) of the 1970s
 Et Cetera (German band), 1971

Albums
Et Cetera (album), a 1965 album by Wayne Shorter
Et Cetera, a 1976 album by Canadian band Et Cetera 
Et Cetera, a 1971 album by German band Et Cetera
Et Cetera..., a 2006 album by Serge Gainsbourg
Et Cetera, a 2007 album by One Ok Rock
 Etc. (album), a 2002 album by Jawbreaker
 Etc., a 2000 album by Fulano de Tal
 Etc., a 2001 album by Lloyd Cole
 Etc. Etc. Etc., a 1970 album by Celia Cruz

Songs
 "Et Cetera" (song), Ireland's Eurovision 2009 entry performed by Sinéad Mulvey and Black Daisy
 "Etcetera" (song), a song by The Beatles
 "Etc", by Caetano Veloso from Estrangeiro 1989 	
 "Etcetera", by Neil Innes from The Innes Book of Records

Other uses
 Et Cetera (manga), a manga series

See also
 Stenoptilia etcetera, a moth
 ETC (disambiguation) acronyms E.T.C. only